Paolo Roberto Ortíz (born 14 January 1985) is a Paraguayan football goalkeeper who currently plays for General Caballero.

See also
Football in Paraguay
List of football clubs in Paraguay

References

External links
 BDFA profile

1985 births
Living people
Paraguayan footballers
Association football goalkeepers
Expatriate footballers in Argentina
Cerro Porteño players
Sportspeople from Asunción